Ceras may refer to:
 the singular of Cerata, anatomical structures found in nudibranch sea slugs, marine opisthobranch gastropod mollusks
 Ceras (gastropod), a mollusc genus in the family Achatinidae
 Centre de Recherche et d’action sociales, a French association created in 1903 by Society of Jesus
 "-ceras", a suffix used to describe many horned animals
 Cera dynasty, an Indian dynasty that ruled over parts of southern India